John Miller Groves (21 July 1914 – 19 January 1996) was a cricket player and administrator who played first-class cricket for Jamaica from 1935 to 1950.

After attending St. George's College he worked as an accountant. He played two first-class matches as an opening batsman for Jamaica against MCC in 1934-35, and one as a middle-order batsman and wicket-keeper against the touring Yorkshire team in 1935-36. After the war he captained a young Jamaican team on its two-match tour of Trinidad in 1949-50, making his highest first-class score of 38 in the second match, batting at number four. He also captained a Jamaica Colts side against British Guiana in a five-day non-first-class match in 1956-57.

He later served as Secretary to the West Indies Cricket Board of Control. He also represented Jamaica at football and was a football referee.

Groves was a Roman Catholic. He married Irma Maxwell in 1940, and they had a son and a daughter. He died in Langley, British Columbia, Canada, in 1996.

References

External links

 John Groves at Cricket Archive

1914 births
1996 deaths
Cricketers from Kingston, Jamaica
Jamaica cricketers
Jamaican cricketers
Jamaican cricket administrators
Jamaican footballers
Jamaica international footballers
Jamaican football referees
Jamaican emigrants to Canada
Association footballers not categorized by position
Jamaican Roman Catholics